Ispočetka (trans. From the beginning) is the 10th studio album by Dino Merlin, and was released on 9 June 2008. The first single promoting the album, "Otrkit ću ti tajnu", was released in August 2007 as a free download in partnership with BH Telecom. He signed a contract with Croatia Records, MPBHRT and City Records. One of the songs, named "Dabogda", from the album is done with Hari Mata Hari, the famous Bosnian singer. The complete song is written by Dino Merlin. Ispočetka is in the top 10 best selling albums 2008 in Serbia

History 
The album itself was announced through a promotional single titled "Otkrit ċu ti tajnu" in August 2007. As with his previous works such as Sredinom and Burek the album includes several collaborations with local and regional artists.

In an interview with Maxi Magazin Dino stated that the decision to release the promotional single was made to ease the burden of dealing with over twenty songs he is currently working on and knowing that some of them will never be released. In the same interview he stated that he has enough material for a double CD but that "life is too short for double CD's."

The song "Otkrit ċu ti tajnu" can be downloaded by visiting the BH Telecom Web site. The second single, titled "Dabogda" was released 29 May 2008 to all regional radio and TV stations.

Dino's official site also announced a concert date to coincide with the promotion of Ispočetka.

Track listing

Singles
"Otkrit Ću Ti Tajnu" was the first promo single, and was released in August 2007.
"Dabogda"(feat. Hari Varešanović) was released a few days before the album release. The video has been shot on Baščaršija in Sarajevo. The director was Pjer Žalica.
"Da Šutiš" was released in July 2008. The video was directed by Radislav Jovanov Gonzo and produced by DIM BiH/Hr.
"Deset Mlađa" was released in December 2008. The video was premiered at a concert in Switzerland. The main role in the video is played by Giusy lo Brutto, an Italian actress. The video is shot in Switzerland and filmed in black and white. It was directed by Haris Dubica.
"Ispočetka" was the fifth single. The video premiere was 15 May 2009.
"Nedostaješ" is the sixth video from the album. It was shot in Sarajevo in June 2009, after Dino returned from Montenegro, where he held a concert in Podgorica and shot a video in Budva for his duet with Emina Jahović for the song "Med" from her album Vila.
"Individualizam" was the seventh video from the album. The video was shot over a period of two years, in New York, Tokyo, Luzern, Paris, Lyon, Madrid, Lisbon and Sanski Most. The video included five hundred people. The video was directed by Haris Dubica.

Koševo 2008
A concert at Koševo Stadium was held on 19 July 2008. It was a big event, one of the biggest in Bosnia in the past few years. Special guest of the concert were Hari Varešanović for the song "Dabogda", Tony Cetinski for the song "Drama", Eldin Huseinbegović for the song "Da šutiš (Indigo)" and Vesna Zmijanac for "Klupko" and one of his biggest hits "Kad zamirišu jorgovani". 65,000 people came to the concert. Dino sang for 3 hours. The concert begun with "Otkrit ću ti tajnu", and ended with the duet "Kad zamirišu jorgovani". DVD Dino Merlin Koševo 19. Juli was released in January 2009.

Tour
The tour for promoting the album started on Koševo. A few concerts were held after that. Then Dino has been on vacation. The tour was continued in autumn. Merlin said that he will make a concert in Belgrade. The Europe tour was continued in March. He toured in USA in April and in Australia in May 2009.
Dino was invited to opet the new arena in Zenica with a concert. But all 9000 tickets were sold out, so he decided to make another concert on Saturday, 21 March. So over 15,000 people were on the concerts. It was the first time in Bosnia and Herzegovina that an artist played two concerts in two days in the same arena. The tickets were available for 10 KM($7), but they were sold illegally for 35 KM($24). That was also unusual in Bosnia.
After more than 20 years Dino decided to visit Serbia and to make a concert in Belgrade. On Monday, 10 October, the first day of the tickets sale for the concert in the Belgrade Arena a record has been broken: 2500 tickets were sold in the first four hours. The concert was sold out in four days. Another show has been added on 26 November. After the second show was sold out another one was added. All three shows were sold out, 60,000 people attended.

Tour dates

References

External links
 "Otkrit Ću Ti Tajnu" free download site

Dino Merlin albums
2008 albums
City Records albums